Neocypholaelaps is a genus of mites in the family Ameroseiidae. There are more than 20 described species in Neocypholaelaps.

Species
These 22 species belong to the genus Neocypholaelaps:

 Neocypholaelaps ampullula Berlese, 1910
 Neocypholaelaps apicola Delfinado-Baker & Baker, 1983
 Neocypholaelaps breviperitrematus Elsen, 1972
 Neocypholaelaps capitis Elsen, 1972
 Neocypholaelaps ceylonicus Narita & Moraes, 2011
 Neocypholaelaps cocos Evans, 1963
 Neocypholaelaps crocisae Elsen, 1972
 Neocypholaelaps favus Ishikawa, 1968
 Neocypholaelaps geonomae Moraes & Narita, 2010
 Neocypholaelaps hongkongensis Mo, 1969
 Neocypholaelaps indicus Evans, 1963
 Neocypholaelaps kreiteri Narita, Pedelabat & De Moraes, 2013
 Neocypholaelaps leopoldi Elsen, 1972
 Neocypholaelaps malayensis Delfinado-Baker, Baker & Phoon, 1989
 Neocypholaelaps novaehollandiae Evans, 1963
 Neocypholaelaps novus Elsen, 1972
 Neocypholaelaps phooni Baker & Delfinado-Baker, 1985
 Neocypholaelaps pradhani Gupta, 1969
 Neocypholaelaps stridulans Evans, 1955
 Neocypholaelaps varipilosus Elsen, 1972
 Neocypholaelaps wilsoni Allred, 1970
 Neocypholaelaps xylocopae Elsen, 1972

References

External links

 

Ameroseiidae
Articles created by Qbugbot